Argyria venatella is a moth in the family Crambidae. It was described by Schaus in 1922. It is found in Cuba.

References

Argyriini
Moths described in 1922
Moths of the Caribbean
Endemic fauna of Cuba